Lysenko (Lysienka) or Lisenko is a Ukrainian surname. It most often refers to:

 Mykola Lysenko (1842–1912), Ukrainian composer, after whom the Lysenko music school and Lysenko State Conservatory are named.
 Trofim Lysenko (1898–1976), Soviet agronomist, politician and scientist, after whom the term Lysenkoism was named.

Other notable people with this surname include:

Sports 
Alla Lysenko (born 1969), Ukrainian Paralympic rower
Anastasiya Lysenko (born 1995), Ukrainian weightlifter
Anna Lysenko (born 1991), Ukrainian boxer
Dmytro Lysenko (born 1981), Ukrainian diver
Lyudmila Lysenko (biathlete) (born 1973), Belarusian biathlete
Ruslan Lysenko (born 1976), Ukrainian biathlete
Tatiana Lysenko (born 1975), Soviet and Ukrainian gymnast
Tatyana Lysenko (born 1983), Russian hammer thrower

Football 
Oleksandr Lysenko (born 1956), Soviet-Ukrainian footballer
Sergei Lysenko (footballer, born 1972), Russian footballer
Sergei Lysenko (footballer, born 1976), Russian footballer
Stanislav Lysenko (born 1972), Russian footballer
Viktor Lysenko (1947–2003), Soviet footballer
Volodymyr Lysenko (born 1988), Ukrainian footballer

Other 
Anatoly Lysenko (1937–2021), Russian television figure, journalist, director, producer
Māra Lisenko (born 1986), Latvian singer-songwriter
Natalya Lisenko (1884–1969), Ukrainian-Russian actress
Rada Lysenko (1921–2021), Ukrainian pianist
Stefan Lysenko, Ukrainian-American film maker
Vladimir Lysenko (born 1955), Russian traveller

See also
Lubov Zsiltzova-Lisenko (born 1956), Ukrainian chess player

Ukrainian-language surnames
Surnames of Ukrainian origin